Pandanus eydouxia is a species of plant in the family Pandanaceae, endemic to Mauritius.

Description

A tall (10-12m) branching tree that forms a wide, domed canopy. The 20–25 cm wide trunk is grey and cracked, while younger stems bear brown leaf-scars. The stems are lined with many small, sharp knobs.

The leaves are long, drooping and glaucous-green to yellow-green with more brownish bases. Leaf margins are lined with tiny, mild, white spines that can age to a yellow or brown. The leaf midrib also has spines, but not near the base.

This species is most easily distinguished by its very large (20–25 cm), rounded fruit-head, that is held up erect on a short peduncle that is densely covered in protective bracts. Each fruit-head holds 15-25 drupes, that are flat-topped and covered in stigmas, but otherwise variable in shape. 
The half or third of the drupe, that is inside the fruit-head, becomes orange or red when ripe. Each drupe holds a large number (over 50) of carpels.

Habitat
It is endemic to Mauritius, and probably the most common endemic species still occurring on that island, especially in the wetter highlands. Large clumps can still be found by rivers and in thickets.

References

eydouxia
Endemic flora of Mauritius
Taxa named by Isaac Bayley Balfour